Modern University for Business and Science (MUBS) is a university in Beirut, Lebanon. MUBS which was founded in 2000, and was previously founded by the Middle East Canadian Academy of Technology (MECAT). MUBS has 5 campuses in Beirut, Damour, Aley, Semkanieh Center, Rashaya, and a community center found in Jal El Dib.

Faculties
The University has three constituent faculties:
 Faculty of Computer & Applied Sciences
 Faculty of Business Administration
 Faculty of Education & Humanities
 Faculty of Health Sciences

Academic Courses
The courses offered at the university include the following:

Undergraduate
 Bachelor of Science in Optometry and Vision Science
 Bachelor of Science in Computer Science 
 Bachelor of Science in Computer & Communication Systems 
 Bachelor of Science in Information Security 
 Bachelor of Science in Computer Network & Data Communications
 Bachelor of Science in Graphic Design
 Bachelor of Science in Accounting
 Bachelor of Science in Banking & Finance
 Bachelor of Science in Business Administration 
 Bachelor of Science in Business Information Systems 
 Bachelor of Science in Hospitality Management
 Bachelor of Science in Human Resource Management
 Bachelor of Science in Marketing
 Bachelor of Science in Management
 Bachelor of Science in Economics
 Bachelor of Science in Tourism
 Bachelor of Science in International Business
 Bachelor of Science in Entrepreneurship
 Bachelor of Arts in Early Childhood Education
 Bachelor of Arts in Educational Management
 Bachelor of Arts in Math & Sciences
 Bachelor of Arts in Arabic & Social Studies
 Bachelor of Arts in Social Work

Graduate Courses
 Master of Business Administration (MBA)
 Doctor of Philosophy (PhD) in Business Administration
 Master of Computer Science (MCS)

Student Affairs
Among the responsibilities of the office of student affairs of the university, the following activities are covered:

 Elected Student Representative Committees
 Office of Counseling and Guidance
 Career Development Center
 Athletics: (Basketball - Men, Soccer - Men, Table Tennis, Chess, Trap, Volley Ball, Martial Arts, Aerobics - Women)

Notable alumni
Aubai Shbib

See also
List of universities in Lebanon

References

External links
  MUBS Homepage

2000 establishments in Lebanon
Educational institutions established in 2000
Universities in Lebanon